The 2024 Australian Capital Territory general election will be held on or before Saturday the 19th of October 2024 to elect all 25 members of the unicameral ACT Legislative Assembly.

The election will be conducted by the ACT Electoral Commission, using the proportional Hare-Clark system.

Background
The Labor Party, led by Chief Minister Andrew Barr, is attempting to win re-election for a seventh consecutive term (either with a majority of seats or via forming a coalition with another party) in the 25-member unicameral Legislative Assembly. Labor formed a coalition government with the Greens after the last election, and together the two parties hold 16 of the 25 seats in the Assembly. Leader of the Opposition and Liberals leader Alistair Coe was replaced by Elizabeth Lee following the election.

All members of the unicameral Assembly faced re-election, with members being elected by the Hare-Clark system of proportional representation. The Assembly is divided into five electorates with five members each:
Brindabella – contains the district of Tuggeranong (except part of the suburb of Kambah east of Drakeford Drive).
Ginninderra – contains the district of Belconnen (except the suburbs of Giralang and Kaleen).
Kurrajong – contains the districts of Canberra Central (excluding Deakin and Yarralumla), Jerrabomberra, Kowen and Majura.
Murrumbidgee – contains the districts of the Woden Valley, Weston Creek, Molonglo Valley, the South Canberra suburbs of Deakin and Yarralumla and the western part of the Tuggeranong suburb of Kambah.
Yerrabi – contains the districts of Gungahlin, Hall and the Belconnen suburbs of Giralang and Kaleen.

Opinion polling

See also
 Members of the Australian Capital Territory Legislative Assembly, 2020–2024

References

2024 elections in Australia
Elections in the Australian Capital Territory
2020s in the Australian Capital Territory